Kutuzovskaya:
 Kutuzovskaya (Filyovskaya Line)
 Kutuzovskaya (Moscow Central Circle)
 Kutuzovskaya (railroad station)